Moshe Aaron Yess (April 18, 1945 – January 8, 2011) was an Orthodox Jewish musician, composer and entertainer from Montreal, Quebec, Canada.
A member of the Chabad community in Montreal, Yess was a regular performer at Chabad House events and shows, together with general music festivals and the annual A Time for Music concert.

In the 1960s, Yess shared stages with David Crosby, Jefferson Airplane, and The Association. For a time he was part of a psychedelic music group named Research 1-6-12 which produced one album in 1968. As a solo performer he played in Las Vegas, Reno, and other hot spots. In 1978 he moved from Hollywood, California to Jerusalem, where he enrolled in the Dvar Yerushalayim Yeshiva. There he met Rabbi Shalom Levine, who became his mentor in halacha and his musical partner in Megama. They spoke about harnessing American-style music to communicate the beauty and values of Judaism. Thus was Megama (Hebrew for "trend") born.

One of Yess's biggest hit songs was "My Zaidy," in which the speaker remembers his grandfather, who was his last link to Judaism. "My Zaidy" — "zaidy" is the Yiddish word for grandpa — touched several generations of American and Canadian Jews. Other hits by Megama included "Ain't Gonna Work on Saturday" and "Not Ashamed," and one of their successful children's shows was called "Judeo Rodeo".

Yess collaborated with Abie Rotenberg to produce the children's audio series called The Marvelous Midos Machine composed of three volumes, with all-original material. When Rotenberg produced the 4th volume in December 2011, he made the album in tribute to Yess. In the 1990s, Yess started a rock band called Burnt Offering with the blessing of The Lubavitcher Rebbe. He eventually became a follower of Lubavitch Messianism, creating a website promoting his views. Yess and the noted American composer/lyricist and scholar Maury Yeston are first cousins, whose fathers were brothers who'd emigrated from London to Montreal.

Last years and death
Yess retired from music in his later years when his health began to decline. Moshe Yess died of cancer on January 8, 2011, in Tucson, Arizona. He was 65 years old. He left the world with 6 children. His second to oldest, Tali Yess is a Jewish singer, songwriter, and producer like his father who has performed and covered several of his late father's popular songs. Tali Yess had released a few previously unreleased songs written by his father over the years since Moshe Yess passed away.

Discography

Megama Duo 
Megama (1980)
Megama – G-d is Alive and Well in Jerusalem (1982)
Megama – Farewell Concert (1988)
Megama – Greatest Hits Plus (1999)

Solo Albums 

 Kein Yevarech (with Kol Salonika) (1984)
 Moshe Yess (1984)
Pintele Yid (1986)
Shabbos on My Mind (1987)
Art Imitates Life (1991)
No Limitations
Rock for the Redemption

With Other's 

The Jerusalem Echoes – Coming Home (guitar & vocals) (1983)
Journeys – Volumes 1-3 (with Abie Rotenberg) (1984,1989,1992)
משיח (with Avi Piamenta)
The Yess Legacy – A Tribute to the Music of Moshe Yess (2013)

Children's Albums 

 The Marvelous Midos Machine – Episode 1: Up Up & Away (with Abie Rotenberg) (1986)
 The Marvelous Midos Machine – Episode 2: Shnooky to the Rescue (with Abie Rotenberg) (1987)

The Marvelous Midos Machine – Episode 3: Does Anyone Have the Time? (with Abie Rotenberg) (1988)

The Amazing Torah Bike – Yetziyas Metzrayim (1988)
The Amazing Torah Bike – Brochos (1989)
The Amazing Torah Bike 3
The Jewish Kids Show
Roburg (1991)
Songs about Safety
Silly Tales of Chelm and other Stories
Project Majestic – A Purim Story (with Reuven Stone)
Stories My Zaidy Told Me 1–3 (with Reuven Stone)
Story of Noah's Ark (with Reuven Stone)
Story of Yonah & the Big Fish (with Reuven Stone)

References

1945 births
2011 deaths
Canadian Orthodox Jews
Baalei teshuva
Hasidic singers
Jewish Canadian musicians
Chabad-Lubavitch Hasidim
Musicians from Montreal
20th-century Canadian male musicians
Jewish folk singers
Deaths from cancer in Arizona
Jewish rock musicians